The Royal Waterloo Hospital for Children and Women was a hospital located on the corner of Waterloo Bridge Road and Stamford Street near Waterloo station in London, England. Closed in 1981 it is now a dormitory building for the London branch of the University of Notre Dame.

History 
The hospital was founded by Dr John Bunnell Davis in 1816 as the Universal Dispensary for Children. In this first incarnation the hospital was located at St Andrew's Hill, in the now demolished Doctors' Commons in the City of London. The name of the hospital was changed to the Royal Universal Dispensary for Children in 1821 and, after a foundation stone was laid by the Duke of York for new premises near Waterloo Bridge in 1823, it moved into the new premises in 1824.

It became the Royal Universal Infirmary for Children in 1824, the Royal Infirmary for Children in 1843 and the Royal Infirmary for Children and Women in 1852. In an 1856 review of the hospital system in London, the British Journal of Homeopathy noted the serious shortage of hospital beds for children in London:

Again, London possesses but one hospital (Hospital for Sick Children, Great Ormond Street), where sick children are received, containing the insignificant number of 30 beds. Paris has a large hospital (Enfants Malades), containing 600 beds for sick children. The Royal Infirmary for Children, Waterloo Bridge Road, is said to be capable, with a few alterations, of containing 80 beds; but we have no reason to suppose that it does yet contain any; and as its funds are stated to be very limited, there seems small hopes of its taking in sick children for the present.

The hospital underwent a further name change to the Royal Hospital for Children and Women in 1875. The new hospital was opened by Princess Louise in 1877, with one ward renamed the Louise Ward in her honour. 

Between 1903 and 1904 premises were built at a cost of £45,000 to house an outpatients' department and inpatient accommodation of 90 beds at the corner of Waterloo Bridge Road and Stamford Street near Waterloo station. By the year of the hospital's rebuilding in 1903 the concerns over bed space remained: an article in the British Medical Journal raised the concern that the Waterloo site left little room for extension. It became the Royal Waterloo Hospital for Children and Women at that time.

The hospital joined the National Health Service in 1948 as part of the nearby St Thomas' Hospital group of hospitals (now Guy's and St Thomas' NHS Foundation Trust). The Royal Waterloo Hospital closed on 27 July 1976. The building was awarded Grade II listed status by English Heritage in 1980. In 1981 it was sold and for the next three decades was the central London campus of Schiller International University. In 2011, Schiller International University moved out of the building and sold it to University of Notre Dame of South Bend, Indiana, USA where it was renovated and converted into dormitories.

Notable staff
Walter Cooper Dendy, surgeon and writer
Charles Hilton Fagge, physician and author of medical papers
John Cooper Forster, surgeon and author of medical papers
Dr Braxton Hicks, who described Braxton Hicks contractions
William Sargant, controversial psychiatrist
William Shearman, physician and medical writer 
Charles West, physician, founder of Great Ormond Street Hospital 
Sir Samuel Wilks, physician, medical writer, biographer

See also 
Healthcare in London
Guy's and St Thomas' NHS Foundation Trust
St Thomas' Hospital

References

External links
 
 Entry on the Royal Waterloo Hospital on the English Heritage Website
 Royal Waterloo Hospital Archives on AIM25 (Archives in London and the M25 Area Website)

Hospital buildings completed in 1816
Defunct hospitals in London
Health in the London Borough of Lambeth
Hospitals established in 1816
1976 disestablishments in England
Grade II listed buildings in the London Borough of Lambeth
History of the London Borough of Lambeth
Women's hospitals
Children's hospitals in the United Kingdom
1816 establishments in England
Women in London
University of Notre Dame